The following are the 80 municipalities of the canton of Lucerne, Switzerland.

List 

Adligenswil
Aesch
Alberswil
Altbüron
Altishofen
Ballwil
Beromünster
Buchrain
Büron
Buttisholz
Dagmersellen
Dierikon
Doppleschwand
Ebikon
Egolzwil
Eich
Emmen
Entlebuch
Ermensee
Eschenbach
Escholzmatt-Marbach
Ettiswil
Fischbach
Flühli
Geuensee
Gisikon
Greppen
Grossdietwil
Grosswangen
Hasle
Hergiswil bei Willisau
Hildisrieden
Hitzkirch
Hochdorf
Hohenrain
Honau
Horw
Inwil
Knutwil
Kriens
Luthern
Luzern
Malters
Mauensee
Meggen
Meierskappel
Menznau
Nebikon
Neuenkirch
Nottwil
Oberkirch
Pfaffnau
Rain
Reiden
Rickenback
Roggliswil
Römerswil
Romoos
Root
Rothenburg
Ruswil
Schenkon
Schlierbach
Schongau
Schötz
Schüpfheim
Schwarzenberg
Sempach
Sursee
Triengen
Udligenswil
Ufhusen
Vitznau
Wauwil
Weggis
Werthenstein
Wikon
Willisau
Wolhusen
Zell

See also
:Category:Former municipalities of the canton of Lucerne

References

Further reading
ZVSE (in German)
Rechtsdienst (in German)
Luzerner Kantonsspital (in German)
Umzugsfirma (in German)
Stadt Luzern (in German)

 
Canton of Lucerne
Lucerne